Kirara Beach may refer to:

Kirara Beach, Shimane
Kirara Beach, Yamaguchi